Santiago Machuca (born 21 February 1929) is a Puerto Rican former sports shooter. He competed in the 50 metre pistol event at the 1972 Summer Olympics.

References

1929 births
Living people
Puerto Rican male sport shooters
Olympic shooters of Puerto Rico
Shooters at the 1972 Summer Olympics
Place of birth missing (living people)